Junction City may refer to:

Places in the United States
Junction City, Arkansas
Junction City, California
Junction City, Georgia
Junction City, Illinois
Junction City, Kansas
Junction City, Kentucky
Junction City, Louisiana
Junction City, Missouri
Junction City, Ohio
Junction City, Oregon
Junction City, Washington
Junction City, Wisconsin

Other uses
Junction City (film), a 1952 American western film
Operation Junction City, a major engagement during the Vietnam War
Operation Junction City Jr., a major offensive of the Laotian Civil War
Camp Junction City, a U.S. forward operating base in Ramadi, Iraq

See also
 Junction (disambiguation)#Places in the United States